Kualu River is a river in northern Sumatra, Indonesia, about 1600 km northwest of the capital Jakarta.

Geography
The river flows in the northern area of Sumatra with predominantly tropical rainforest climate (designated as Af in the Köppen-Geiger climate classification). The annual average temperature in the area is 21 °C. The warmest month is March, when the average temperature is around 26 °C, and the coldest is October, at 20 °C. The average annual rainfall is 3730 mm. The wettest month is October, with an average of 491 mm rainfall, and the driest is March, with 136 mm rainfall.

See also
List of rivers of Indonesia
List of rivers of Sumatra

References

Rivers of North Sumatra
Rivers of Indonesia